RCT 1 or RCT-1 may refer to:

1st Marine Regiment (United States)
RollerCoaster Tycoon (video game)
Automatic knife made by Ravencrest Tactical